The Green Terror is a 1919 British silent crime film directed by W. P. Kellino and starring Aurelio Sidney, Heather Thatcher and W.T. Ellwanger. It is based on the 1919 novel The Green Rust by Edgar Wallace. An American detective battles an evil Doctor who plans to destroy the world's wheat supplies.

Cast
 Aurelio Sidney as Beale
 Heather Thatcher as Olive Crosswell
 W.T. Ellwanger as Dr. Harden
 Cecil del Gue as Punsunby
 Maud Yates as Hilda Glaum
 Arthur Poole as Kitson

References

Bibliography
 Low, Rachael. History of the British Film, 1918–1929. George Allen & Unwin, 1971.

1919 films
1919 crime films
British crime films
British silent feature films
Films based on British novels
Films based on works by Edgar Wallace
Films directed by W. P. Kellino
British black-and-white films
1910s English-language films
1910s British films